Amoria jamrachii is a species of sea snail, a marine gastropod mollusk in the family Volutidae, the volutes.  It was named after Charles Jamrach, an animal dealer in London, by Dr. John Edward Gray, Keeper of Zoology at the British Museum.

Subspecies
 Amoria jamrachi condei Bail & Limpus, 2001
 Amoria jamrachi jamrachi Gray, 1864: represented as Amoria jamrachii Gray, 1864 (alternate representation)

Description
The length of the shell varies between 45 mm and 70 mm.

Distribution
This marine species occurs off Indonesia and Northwest Australia.

References

 Bail P. & Limpus A. (2001) The genus Amoria. In: G.T. Poppe & K. Groh (eds) A conchological iconography. Hackenheim: Conchbooks. 50 pp., 93 pls.

External links
 

Volutidae
Gastropods described in 1864
Taxa named by John Edward Gray